Count Eigil Knuth (8 August 1903 – 12 March 1996) was a Danish explorer, archaeologist, sculptor and writer. He is referred to as the Nestor ("elder statesman") of Danish polar explorers. His archaeological investigations were made in Peary Land and adjacent areas of High Arctic Greenland. Knuth was made a Knight of the Dannebrog.

Early years
Knuth was born in Klampenborg, near Copenhagen in Denmark. His parents were count Eigil Knuth sr, a captain, and Dijmphna (née Gamel).

His hero was the Norwegian explorer Fridtjof Nansen who, in 1888, was the first to cross the Greenland ice cap; the trip was financed by State Councillor Augustinus Gamel, a Danish businessman, and Knuth's maternal grandfather. Gamel's birth gift to his grandson was a present Gamel had received from Nansen: the compass Nansen carried on his Greenland icecap expedition.

Knuth studied building technology at Royal Danish Academy of Fine Arts, and then woodcarving at Val Gardena in Italy between 1926 and 1928. He published his first book, on the subject of philosophy, in 1927, revealing an affinity with the Danish philosopher Søren Kierkegaard. In 1932, Knuth graduated as a gymnastics teacher from Ollerup Physical Training College in Denmark.

Career
Knuth first trip to Greenland occurred in 1932 accompanying Dr. Aage Roussel from the National Museum of Denmark on an archaeological dig to excavate old Norse sites on West Greenland's coast. Knuth spent the next two years as an art critic for the Copenhagen newspaper Dagens Nyheder.

Assisting Dr. Roussell and Dr. Poul Nørlund during the summer of 1934, Knuth excavated old Norse ruins at Igaliko. In 1935, Dr. Helge Larsen, Ebbe Munck, and Knuth, as archaeologist, assisted on the Augustine Courtauld Expedition to East Greenland, during which Gunnbjørn Fjeld, Greenland's highest mountain, was climbed. The following summer, in 1936, Knuth, Robert Gessain, and Michel Perez participated in the French Trans-Greenland Expedition under Paul-Emile Victor, crossing the Greenland inlandsis (ice cap), starting at Christianshåb in the west, and ending at Tasiilaq/Angmagsalik, an Inuit settlement in the east. It was here that Knuth worked as a sculptor, producing a notable series of busts of the local Inuit.

Knuth financed the bulk of his next expedition, the Danish Northeast Greenland Expedition, also known as the "Danish Northeast Greenland Expedition 1938—39, sent out by Alf Trolle, Ebbe Munck, and Eigil Knuth in memory of the Denmark Expedition", arriving in Greenland with his co-leader and friend, Ebbe Munck, on 19 June 1938. The crew consisted of six more men, a. o. the botanist Paul Gelting. It was one of the first Danish Greenland expeditions to make use of an airplane, a de Havilland Tiger Moth. With the start of war, Knuth could not return to Greenland as planned, instead, becoming an announcer for Denmark Radio in the Danish resistance movement.

During the period of 1948–50, Knuth was back in Greenland and made several discoveries, including a large tool collection of the Thule culture and tool fragments of the Dorset culture. His most important contribution, however, was the first identification and demonstration of Independence I culture and Independence II culture, immigration waves of Paleo-Eskimo, spread apart by almost 3000 years. He named the cultures "Independence" after the Independence Fjord located in Peary Land.

Artist
In addition to sculpting, he produced paintings and watercolours. Some of his works were on display at the 1939 New York World's Fair.

Later years
Knuth's Danish Peary Land Expeditions ended in 1995 with his last visit to Brønlundhus at Brønlund Fjord, which served for almost 50 years as his Peary Land expedition headquarters. He died in Copenhagen the following year and he is buried at Bispebjerg Cemetery.

Knuth in his old age privately regretted that he had not at some point in his earlier
life come out publicly as a homosexual. He committed suicide by firearm in 1996.

Legacy
Before his death, Knuth was unable to complete a comprehensive book summarizing his Peary Land archaeological findings. That task fell upon Bjarne Grønnow, heir to Knuth's archival information.  The Northernmost Ruins of the Globe: Eigil Knuth's archaeological investigations in Peary Land and adjacent areas of High Arctic Greenland (2003) is a compilation of Knuth's findings and observations.

His portrait busts are in Nuuk.

Awards
 1951, Hans Egede Medal, Royal Danish Geographical Society
 1952, Patron's Medal, Royal Geographical Society
 1953, Mungo Park Medal, Royal Scottish Geographical Society
 1979, honorary Doctor of Science degree, University of Copenhagen
 1993, Nersornaat Gold Medal, Home Rule of Greenland

Partial works
 (1927). Kunst og Liv, OCLC 38313431
 (1936). Fire Mand og Solen. : En Tur over Grönlands Indlandsis, OCLC 186735073
 (1940). Under det nordligste Dannebrog, beretning om Dansk Nordøstgrønlands ekspedition 1938—39, OCLC 1839380
 (1942). Report on the expedition and on subsequent work at the Mørkefjord Station, OCLC 251025543
 (1943). Ernst Zeuthen: 1880—1938, OCLC 16916718
 (1943). Billedhugger i Angmagssalik, OCLC 31103011
 (1945). Tanker ved tingene, OCLC 11580030
 (1948). Sommerrejsen til Pearyland, OCLC 13624744
 (1958). Det mystiske X i Danmark fjord, OCLC 10856612
 (1960). Aron of Kangeq: 1822—1869 : The seal hunter who became father of Greenland's art of painting, OCLC 61075103
 (1964). Rapport over Den 3die Peary Land Ekspedition: sommeren 1964, OCLC 45432772
 (1967). Archaeology of the Musk-ox way, OCLC 185867987
 (1967). Thai-Danish Prehistoric Expedition 1960-62 : Archaeological excavations in Thailand, OCLC 220587733
 (1973). Kap Harald Moltke (82⁰09'23"N., 29⁰53'00"W.) : Jørgen Brønlund Fjord, Peary Land: [rapport], OCLC 70279288
 (1980). Umiaq'en fra Peary Land, OCLC 7615402
 (1995). Uafhængighed : hundeslæderejsens filosofi = Kiffaanngissuseq: qimussimik angalanerup isumaliutersuutai = Independence: the philosophy of a dog sledge journey, OCLC 1995
 (2003). Billedhugger i Ammassalik, 
 (2009). Indépendance : la philosophie du voyage en traîneau, éditions Paulsen, Paris
 (2013). Inslandis, éditions Paulsen, Paris

References

1903 births
1996 suicides
Archaeology of Greenland
Danish explorers
Danish nobility
20th-century Danish sculptors
Male sculptors
20th-century archaeologists
Danish male writers
Danish archaeologists
Royal Danish Academy of Fine Arts alumni
Historians of Greenland
Recipients of Nersornaat
People from Gentofte Municipality
Suicides by firearm in Denmark
1996 deaths
Danish male artists
20th-century Danish male artists